The Greene County School District is a public school district in Greene County, Georgia, United States, based in Greensboro. It serves the communities of Greensboro, Scull Shoals, Siloam, Union Point, White Plains, and Woodville.

Schools
The Greene County School District has two elementary schools, one middle school, one high school, and one charter school.

Elementary schools 
Greensboro Elementaryschools in greene Boro 
Union Point STEAM Academy

Middle school
Anita White Carson Middle School

High school
Greene County High School

Charter school
Lake Oconee Charter School

References

External links
School homepage

School districts in Georgia (U.S. state)
Education in Greene County, Georgia